Eugene Lewis Hubka (May 18, 1924 – December 3, 2017) was an American football tailback who played for the Pittsburgh Steelers. He played college football at Bucknell University, having previously attended Perth Amboy High School in Perth Amboy, New Jersey. He was a member of the Bucknell Hall of Fame (inducted 1987). Hubka died on December 3, 2017, at the age of 93.

References

1924 births
2017 deaths
American football running backs
Perth Amboy High School alumni
Pittsburgh Steelers players
Temple Owls football players
Bucknell Bison football players
Players of American football from New Jersey
Sportspeople from Perth Amboy, New Jersey